Allegro de concert or Concert Allegro may refer to:
 Allegro de concert (Chopin)
 Concert Allegro (Elgar)
 Allegro de concierto (Granados)
 Introduction and Concert Allegro (Schumann)